Northern High School is a public secondary school located in Owings, Calvert County, Maryland, United States. In 2018 it had 1484 students attending the school.

History
Northern High School opened halfway through the 1973-1974 school year.

On July 26, 2016, the Calvert County Board of Education awarded a replacement contract to J.A. Scheibel Construction Inc. of Huntingtown, Maryland, for the total replacement of Northern High School. This project was expected to cost $69,382,000, and be completed in December 2018. The phased construction was to implement a  building that could house up to 1,500 students. The contract also approved of renovations and changes to the Mary D. Harrison Cultural Arts Center, which is attached to Northern High. Construction of the main building was completed during December 2018, and classes moved to the new building in January 2019, while the administration wing was completed during the 2019-2020 school year. As of March 2020, renovations to the Mary D. Harrison Cultural Arts center are ongoing.

Demographics
The demographic breakdown of the 1,467 students enrolled for the 2016-17 was:
Male - 50.4%
Female - 49.6%
Native American/Alaskan - >0.1%
Asian - 1.9%
Black - 11.4%
Hispanic - 4.3%
Native Hawaiian/Pacific islander - 0.2%
White - 76.8%
Multiracial - 5.3%

Figures for students receiving financial assistance with meals were not reported to NCES for 2016-17.

Notable alumni
 Ryan Meisinger, baseball player
 Jaelyn Duncan, football player

References

External links
 
 School district website

Public high schools in Maryland
Educational institutions established in 1973
1973 establishments in Maryland
Schools in Calvert County, Maryland